Recognition of prior learning (RPL), prior learning assessment (PLA), or prior learning assessment and recognition (PLAR), describes a process used by regulatory bodies, adult learning centres, career development practitioners, military organizations, human resources professionals, employers, training institutions, colleges and universities around the world to evaluate skills and knowledge acquired outside the classroom for the purpose of recognizing competence against a given set of standards, competencies, or learning outcomes. RPL is practiced in many countries for a variety of purposes, for example an individual's standing in a profession, trades qualifications, academic achievement, recruitment, performance management, career and succession planning.

Methods of assessing prior learning are varied and include: evaluation of prior experience gained through volunteer work, previous paid or unpaid employment, or observation of actual workplace behavior. The essential element of RPL is that it is an assessment of evidence provided by an individual to support their claim for competence against a given set of standards or learning outcomes.

RPL is sometimes confused with Credit Transfer, assessments conducted in order to recognize advanced standing or for assigning academic credit. The essential difference between the two is that RPL considers evidence of competence that may be drawn from any aspect of an applicant's professional or personal life. Credit Transfer and advanced standing deal primarily with an evaluation of academic performance as it relates to a particular field of study and whether or not advanced standing may be granted towards the gaining of additional qualifications. Some academic institutions include Credit Transfer within their overall RPL umbrella, as the process still involves assessment of prior learning, regardless of how achieved.

Terminology 
RPL is known by many names in different countries. It is APL (Accreditation of Prior Learning), CCC (Crediting Current Competence), or APEL (Accrediting Prior Experiential Learning) in the UK, RPL in Australia, New Zealand, and South Africa, and PLAR (Prior Learning Assessment and Recognition) in Canada (although different jurisdictions within Canada use RPL and RCC (Recognition of Current Competence). France has a more sophisticated system in which assessment is known as Bilan de competences, Bilan des competences approfondi, or Validation de Acquis des Experiences (VAE). The United Nations UNESCO organisation has a "Global Convention on the Recognition of Higher Education Qualifications Project" to standardize terminology and definitions used in Higher Education.

History
RPL has been the mainstay of all assessments conducted under national vocational education and training systems since the late 1980s and continues to evolve as different vocational education and training (VET) systems evolve. The concept of RPL can be traced back to the earliest guilds when master craftsmen inspected the work of apprentices in order to determine their competence against the high standards demanded of the different professions of the period. This process was continued during the Industrial Revolution when the first formal apprentice programs were established and realistic workplaces created to train young men and women in the skills and knowledge required of their trade. It was first introduced into the UK by Susan Simosko, a consultant with the National Council for Vocational Qualifications, who adapted it as the central element of all competency-based assessments.

Simosko was employed by the British government to provide support to the creation of the National Vocational Qualifications (NVQ) and Scottish Vocational Qualifications (SVQ) systems during the late 1980s and early 1990s. She introduced and managed the Access to Assessment Initiative project which introduced the concept of Accreditation of Prior Learning as an important pathway for employed and unemployed people to gain formal recognition of their skills and knowledge against standards demanded of employers across the United Kingdom.

Other countries adopted the same processes when developing their own competency-based vocational education and training systems, some aligned solely with the need to assess competence in line with the needs of private and public sector organizations, and others as a critical element of the assessment of skills and knowledge in order to grant vocational qualifications. The National Training Board in Australia was one of the first outside of the UK to develop such a system as a framework for the transition towards the implementation of new apprentice programs and workplace training and assessment under the National Training Reform Agenda. RPL was incorporated under the National Framework for the Recognition of Training and has since remained an important element of all competency-based assessments.

In 2015 the Canadian Association for Prior Learning Assessment (CAPLA) released guidelines for the Recognition of Prior Learning that serve to guide and enhance the assessment of learning through RPL across contexts, contribute to organizational effectiveness, and promote labour force development. Informed by stakeholders, Quality Assurance for the Recognition of Prior Learning in Canada enhances understanding of Quality Assurance issues and good practice. “The manual benefits anyone working with, or on behalf of, applicants, candidates, clients, learners, or any individuals who seek: employment, professional licensure, trade certification, career coaching or counselling, job promotion or change, professional development, academic access, or advanced standing.”

Benefits
RPL is a very simple and straightforward process of assessing someone's skills or knowledge, regardless of where and how these were learned. Unlike other forms of assessment it doesn't judge someone's evidence of competence solely by the credentials or qualifications they have achieved, although this can form part of their claim. Nor does it consider where a person worked, their age, gender or physical attributes.

What RPL does is allow people to demonstrate that they are capable of undertaking specific tasks or working in certain industries based on evidence of skills and knowledge gained throughout their life.

RPL is similar to criterion-referenced assessment – assessment of skills and knowledge against certain criteria. However, while such criteria are generally less descriptive than those used in competency standards, they are outcomes-based (i.e., the outcome of somebody doing something, such as the outcome of writing is a letter, or the outcome of making something which results in an end product), not process-based such as learning.

In teaching or traditional training, the criteria against which formative and summative assessments are conducted is known as teaching or training objectives. (Sometimes these are also referred to as learning objectives but these are really the outcome the learners seeks to achieve, not the teacher or trainer.) They may be written in different ways but in all cases they include the behaviour to be observed, the conditions under which such behaviour is to be performed, and the standards or criteria which the performance must meet. These are the standards to be achieved as a result of the learning or training activity.

Methodology

A prerequisite for RPL is a clear standard against which knowledge, performance and behaviour can be assessed. The standard may be identical to that which is used for defining the desired outcomes for formal training programmes for the same competence, and should unambiguously specify the minimum acceptable requirements for a person to be assessed as competent.

Knowledge is often assessed by written or oral examination. Performance of skills is frequently assessed by direct observation of the performance of the skills and procedures in the working environment, but for some skills such as emergency responses, simulations are often used. Behavioural competence and attitude may be assessed by direct observation, inference from observation, formal examination or combinations to suit the circumstances. Checklists are often used to ensure that standard procedures are carried out in the correct order and without omitting important steps. It may be a requirement that the assessments are documented and recorded as evidence that they have been completed.

See also

References

4. Quality Assurance for the Recognition of Prior Learning in Canada, Canadian Association for Prior Learning Assessment (CAPLA), 2015, http://capla.ca/rpl-qa-manual/ Retrieved 2019-01-31.

Further reading

 Cheng, M. I., &. Dainty, R. I. J. (2005). Toward a multidimensional competency-based managerial performance framework: A hybrid approach. Journal of Managerial Psychology, 20, 380–396
 Draganidis, F., & Mentzas, G. (2006). Competency-based management: A review of systems and approaches. Information Management &Computer Security, 14, 51–64
 Dubois, D., & Rothwell, W. (2004). Competency-Based Human Resource Management. Davies–Black Publishing
 Dubois, D., & Rothwell, W. (2000). The Competency Toolkit (Volumes 1 & 2). HRD Press
 Homer, M. (2001). Skills and competency management. Industrial and Commercial training, 33/2, 59–62
 Horton, S. (2000). Introduction- the competency-based movement: Its origins and impact on the public sector. The International Journal of Public Sector Management, 13, 306–318
 Lucia, A., & Lepsinger, R. (1999). The Art and Science of Competency Models: Pinpointing Critical Success Factors in Organizations. Pfeiffer
 Kochanski, J. T., & Ruse, D. H. (1996). Designing a competency-based human resources organization. Human Resource Management, 35, 19–34
 McEvoy, G., Hayton, J., Wrnick, A., Mumford, T., Hanks, S., & Blahna, M. (2005). A competency-based model for developing human resource professionals. Journal of Management Education, 29, 383–402
 Rausch, E., Sherman, H., & Washbush, J. B. (2002). Defining and assessing competencies for competency-based, outcome-focused management development. The Journal of Management Development, 21, 184–200
 Rutherford, P. D., (1995). Competency Based Assessment: A Guide to Implementation. Pearson Professional
 Rutherford, P. D., (2013). Inside RPL: The Trainer's Guide to Recognition of Prior Learning. Self-published. P D Rutherford & Associates Pty Ltd
 Sanchez, J. I., &. Levine, E. L. (2009). What is (or should be) the difference between competency modeling and traditional job analysis? Human Resource Management Review, 19, 53–63
 Shandler, D. (2000). Competency and the Learning Organization. Crisp Learning
 Shippmann, J. S., Ash, R. A., Battista, M., Carr, L., Eyde, L. D., Hesketh, B., Kehoe, J., Pearlman, K., & Sanchez, J. I. (2000). The practice of competency modeling, Personnel Psychology, 53, 703–740
 Spencer, L M. in Cherniss, C. and D. Goleman, eds. (2001) "The economic value of emotional intelligence competencies and EIC-based HR programs", in The Emotionally Intelligent Workplace: How to Select for, Measure, and Improve Emotional Intelligence in Individuals, Groups and Organizations. San Francisco, CA: Jossey–Bass/Wiley
 Spencer, L. M. (2004). Competency Model Statistical Validation and Business Case Development, HR Technologies White Paper https://web.archive.org/web/20060820215536/http://www.hrcompass.com/validation.html
 Spencer, L., & Spencer, S. (1993). Competence at Work: Models for Superior Performance. Wiley
 Wood. R., & Payne, T. (1998). Competency-Based Recruitment and Selection. Wiley

Educational assessment and evaluation